SRON Netherlands Institute for Space Research is the Dutch expertise institute for space research. The Institute develops and uses innovative technology for research in space, focusing on astrophysical research, Earth science and planetary research. SRON has a line of research into new and more sensitive sensors for X-rays and infrared radiation.

SRON was founded in 1983 under the name Stichting Ruimteonderzoek Nederland or Space Research Organisation, Netherlands. SRON is a member institution of the Dutch Research Council (NWO). The Institute is headquartered in Leiden with additional facilities in the city of Groningen, Netherlands.

Science and technology
The institute has over 250 staff members who are employed in a support department and five divisions: High-Energy Astrophysics (HEA), Low-Energy Astrophysics (LEA), Earth and Planetary Science (EPS), Sensor Research and Technology (SR&T) and Engineering Division (ED).

Technology
SRON's ambition is to act as a leading institute in the development of state-of-the-art satellite instruments for space research missions of ESA, NASA and other agencies. Through the years SRON technology has contributed to many ground-breaking space missions, mainly dedicated to mapping the infrared sky (e.g. IRAS, ISO, HIFI/Herschel), analyzing X-ray and gamma-ray sources (e.g. CGRO/COMPTEL, Beppo-SAX, Chandra, XMM-Newton) and studying the Earth atmosphere (SCIAMACHY/ENVISAT). Examples of future missions to which SRON will contribute are SPICA (infrared), ASTRO-H (X-ray) and Sentinel 5 Precursor (Earth atmosphere). The institute is also planning to contribute to missions which will study other planets in the Solar System and beyond.

Missions and projects

Current missions or projects with SRON contribution
SRON instruments are in brackets.

 Athena (X-IFU)
 Chandra (Low Energy Transmission Grating Spectrometer (LETG))
 XMM-Newton (Reflection Grating Spectrometers (RGS))
 INTEGRAL
 XRISM (Resolve Soft X-Ray Spectrometer)
 LOFT
 ALMA (2 band receivers)
 Sentinel-5p (TROPOMI)
 Sentinel 5 (Immersed gratings)
 MetOp (GOME-2)
 GUSTO
 ARIEL
 PLATO
 PACE (SPEXone)

Previous missions/projects
 BeppoSAX
 Compton Gamma Ray Observatory (COMPTEL)
 Hitomi (High-Resolution Soft X-Ray Spectrometer)
 IRAS
 ISO (Short Wave Spectrometer)
 Astronomical Netherlands Satellite
 GOCE
 ERS-2
 Herschel (HIFI)
 Envisat (SCIAMACHY)

Technology development

In various wavelength areas SRON's sensors are already some of the most sensitive in the world. However, SRON is continuously looking for new ways to deploy even more sensitive sensors for the improved detection of cosmic radiation or measurements of the atmosphere of the Earth and other planets. This requires long-term investments in the development of new sensors, electronics and specialist techniques. In the near future, detectors shall increasingly take the shape of large chips with many megapixels, with a unique combination of two-dimensional pictures and spectroscopy color resolving power.

These detectors require the development of new advanced electronics, smart control software, extreme cooling techniques and novel materials. SRON develops a new generation of detectors, and the necessary read-out and control electronics, for international missions in the submillimetre and far-infrared areas. For example, such extremely sensitive detectors are needed in SPICA/ SAFARI so that we can learn more about protoplanetary disks and the formation of planets. For SPICA/ SAFARI SRON is currently working on Transition Edge Sensors (TES).

National and international partners
SRON cooperates with scientists and with international organizations in bilateral, European or global projects. Within the Netherlands, these include universities in Utrecht, Groningen and Leiden. Outside the Netherlands, an example is the German Aerospace Center (DLR).

Directors
 Johan Bleeker (1983–2003)
  (2003–2009)
 Roel Gathier (2009–2010) (interim)
 Rens Waters (2010–2019)
 Michael Wise (2019-...)

See also 

 List of space telescopes

References

External links
 SRON

Science and technology in the Netherlands
Space agencies
1983 establishments in the Netherlands